Bollywood Dream (Portuguese: Bollywood Dream - O Sonho Bollywoodiano) is a 2010 Brazilian–Indian  adventure-comedy film  written and directed by Beatriz Seigner. It is the first co-production between Brazil and India, and the film debut of Beatriz Seigner as director.	

The film follows the story of three Brazilian actresses who decide to try their luck in Bollywood, India's film industry, but once entered into the heart of Indian culture and mythology, their dreams are modified by the contrast between East and West.

References

External links
 

2010 films
Films shot in São Paulo
Films shot in India
2010s Portuguese-language films
2010s English-language films
Brazilian adventure comedy films
2010s adventure comedy films
2010 directorial debut films
2010 comedy films
2010 multilingual films
Brazilian multilingual films
Indian multilingual films